Dipsastraea is a genus of stony corals in the family Merulinidae. Members of this genus are native to the Indo-Pacific region. They are zooxanthellate corals.

Species 
The following species are currently recognized by the World Register of Marine Species :

Dipsastraea albida  (Veron, 2000)
Dipsastraea amicorum  (Milne Edwards & Haime, 1849)
Dipsastraea camranensis  (Latypov, 2013)
Dipsastraea danai  (Milne Edwards, 1857)
Dipsastraea faviaformis  (Veron, 2000)
Dipsastraea favus  (Forskål, 1775)
Dipsastraea helianthoides  (Wells, 1954)
Dipsastraea lacuna  (Veron, Turak & DeVantier, 2000)
Dipsastraea laddi  (Wells, 1954)
Dipsastraea laxa  (Klunzinger, 1879)
Dipsastraea lizardensis  (Veron, Pichon & Wijsman-Best, 1977)
Dipsastraea maritima  (Nemezo, 1971)
Dipsastraea marshae  (Veron, 2000)
Dipsastraea matthaii  (Vaughan, 1918)
Dipsastraea maxima  (Veron, Pichon & Wijsman-Best, 1977)
Dipsastraea modesta  (Nemenzo, 1971)
Dipsastraea pallida  (Dana, 1846)
Dipsastraea rosaria  (Veron, 2000)
Dipsastraea rotumana  (Gardiner, 1899)
Dipsastraea speciosa  (Dana, 1846)
Dipsastraea truncata  (Veron, 2000)
Dipsastraea veroni  (Moll & Best, 1984)
Dipsastraea vietnamensis  (Veron, 2000)
Dipsastraea wisseli  (Scheer & Pillai, 1983)

References 

Merulinidae
Scleractinia genera